Samuel Maoz (Hebrew: שמואל מעוז; born c. 1962) is an Israeli film director. His 
2009 film, Lebanon won the Golden Lion at the 66th Venice International Film Festival. He also won the award for Best Screenplay for Lebanon at the Asia Pacific Screen Awards in 2010.

Biography
Shmuel (Shmuel) Maoz was born in Tel Aviv.  At the age of 20, he was a gunner in one of the first Israeli tanks to enter Lebanon in the 1982 Lebanon War. After the war, he trained as a cameraman at the Beit Zvi theater school, and did art direction in film and television productions.

Film career
As a director, Maoz was associated with the production of documentary films, directing the Arte production Total Eclipse (2000) with Evgenia Dodina. In 2007, Maoz began working on Lebanon, his first feature film.  The script, based on Maoz's personal experiences, describes the traumatic experiences of a four-man Israeli tank crew in a Lebanese village early in the war.

At the end of July 2009, Maoz received an invitation to the competition of the 66th Venice Film Festival, where he won the Golden Lion after having had been rejected at the Berlin and the Cannes film festivals.

Lebanon was praised as one of the most compelling competition entries. That same year the film was nominated for the Ophir, Israel's national film awards, in ten categories.

His next film, Foxtrot (2017), won the Grand Jury Prize at the Venice Film Festival.

Filmography
Total Eclipse (2000)
Lebanon (2009)
Foxtrot (2017)

References

External links 

IONCINEMA.com interview with Samuel Maoz for Lebanon

1960s births
Date of birth missing (living people)
Israeli film directors
Israeli Jews
Israeli people of Turkish-Jewish descent
Israeli people of Polish-Jewish descent
European Film Awards winners (people)
Directors of Golden Lion winners
Beit Zvi School for the Performing Arts alumni
Living people